is a Japanese retired professional Go player.

Biography 
Otake was born in Kitakyūshū City, Japan. He joined the legendary Kitani Minoru school when he was 9, and quickly rose up the ranks to turn professional in 1956, when he was 14. He progressed swiftly, achieving 9 dan in 1970. He did not have much patience, which could be seen as he would sometimes read comic books while he waited for his opponent to play.

He retired from professional Go in 2021 at the age of 79. His career win–loss record was 1319 wins, 846 losses, 5 draws (jigo), and 1 no-result.

Titles and runners-up
Ranks #4 in total number of titles in Japan.

Trivia 
 Otake is Honorary Gosei.
 Otake is known for his fast play and earned the nickname "God Of Hayago".

Honours
  Order of the Rising Sun, 3rd Class, Gold Rays with Neck Ribbon (2015)

References

1942 births
Japanese Go players
Living people
People from Kitakyushu
Recipients of the Medal with Purple Ribbon